The First Fleet was a formation of the Royal Navy that briefly existed before the First World War from 1912 to 1914.

History
Formed on 31 July 1912 the Commander-in-Chief Home Fleets had direct command of the First Fleet; and a Vice Admiral commanded the Second and Third Fleets. All the numbered fleets during this period had different levels of battle readiness for example the first fleet ships were in full commission. The fleet also included, under Captain Cecil Lambert, four destroyer flotillas. Captain Reginald Tyrwhitt took over the command of the destroyer flotillas in December 1913.

Commanders

Components
Included

References

Sources
  Government, H.M. (October 1913). "List of officers on active list of the Royal Navy with the dates of their seniority". The Navy List. H.M Stationery Office.

External links

Fleets of the Royal Navy
Military units and formations established in 1912
Military units and formations disestablished in 1914
1912 establishments in the United Kingdom
Military units and formations of the Royal Navy in World War I